Barbeyella minutissima is a slime mould species of the order Echinosteliales, and the only species of the genus Barbeyella. First described in 1914 from the Jura mountains, its habitat is restricted to montane spruce and spruce-fir forests of the Northern Hemisphere, where it has been recorded from Asia, Europe, and North America. It typically colonises slimy, algae-covered logs that have lost their bark and have been partially to completely covered by liverworts. The sporangia are roughly spherical, up to 0.2 mm in diameter, and supported by a thin stalk up to 0.7 mm tall. After the spores have developed, the walls of the sporangia split open into lobes. The species is one of the smallest members of the Myxogastria and is considered rare.

Taxonomy and classification

Meylan thought the species warranted a new genus based on the unique mode of dehiscence and the makeup of the capillitium. The genus was named for the Swiss botanist William Barbey (1842–1914). It and the genus Clastoderma together make up the family Clastodermataceae. Studies of the ultrastructure of the sporocarps suggests that Barbeyella occupies a systematic position intermediate between Echinosteliales and the Stemonitales.

Characteristics

The protoplasmodium, a microscopic, undifferentiated granular mass with a slime sheath, is transparent and colourless. A single sporangiophore (the fruiting structure) is produced from the semispherical protoplasmodium, which is approximately one and a half times the diameter of mature sporangia. It acquires dark spots as it matures and the centre of the protoplasm later becomes dark. Then, the transparent and milk-white protoplasmodium climbs along the stem to the top, where first the capillitium and peridium and finally the spores are produced. At room temperature, this process lasts roughly one day.

The long-stemmed, blackish-brown or blackish-purple, barely translucent sporangia of Barbeyella are spherical, 0.15 to 0.2 mm in diameter and together with the stem measure 0.3 to 0.7 mm long. They are usually scattered on the substrate, but also often grouped in loose, large colonies. The hypothallus (the tissue upon which the sporangiophore rests)  has a diameter of at least 0.7 mm. Although not visible on mosses, it has a reddish-brown color when growing on wood. The brownish-black stem is up to 0.1 mm thick, thinning to 5 µm towards the top and is filled with protoplasmatic scrap material. The columella – arising from the stem tip – matures at the upper end at roughly half the height of the sporangiophore into 7 to 13 simple or occasionally bifurcated, 1 to 4 µm large, dark-brown capillitium strands. Usually individual, occasionally in pairs, these are firmly fused with the lobed segments of the peridium, which are round in cross-section. When the spores mature, the sporangium splits and empties into the peridium towards the base. This prevents the lobes of the peridium from detaching and provides spore dispersal over a longer period, similar to a dehiscing capsule. The sporangia are filled towards the top with plasmatic granules, which diminish increasingly towards the base. Depending on the size of the plasmatic granules, the sporangia appear papillate or smooth.

The mass of spores is blackish brown, or brown if viewed under polarised light. The surface texture ranges from almost smooth to warty, and the spores measure 7–9 µm in diameter. Material collected from Oregon, however, varies from European material in several ways: the fruit body is brown; the branching of the capillitium from the columella differs (having primary and secondary branches instead of radiating branches from an expanded tip); the spore mass is tan, and individual spores measure 10–12 µm.

Habitat and distribution

Barbeyella minutissima is considered rare. Its habitat corresponds to the mountainous spruce-fir forests of the Northern Hemisphere. It has been found in Europe (Finland, Germany, Switzerland, Poland, Romania, Latvia, and Russia), in west and east North America (Washington, Oregon, California, and Mexico; North and South Carolina and Virginia), in the Indian Himalayas as well as in Japan. It is relatively common in fir forests on high-altitude Mexican volcanoes, suggesting that air-borne spore dispersal is effective.

Ecology

The species grows only on slightly to heavily rotten and barkless deadwood in coniferous forests in cool, moist areas. The wood is about 40 to 100% overgrown with Marchantiophyta, especially of the genera Nowellia or Cephalozia. B. minutissima has been found growing on the liverwort Lepidozia reptans, although Nowellia curvifolia is the main indicator for the slime mould. In addition to liverworts, Barbeyella is found socialised with monocellular algae. It is assumed that the protoplasmodium phagocytises either the algae or the bacteria on their surface. Other Myxogastria species are often found together with Barbeyella, especially Lepidoderma tigrinum, Lamproderma columbinum and Colloderma oculatum. Aphanocladium album is a myxomyceticolous fungus (i.e., living on or within the fruit bodies of myxomycetes) that has been reported growing on specimens of B. minutissima collected from North Carolina.

References

External links 
Discover Life Images and description

Myxogastria